Geodermatophilus arenarius is a Gram-positive, aerobic and xerophilic bacterium from the genus Geodermatophilus which has been isolated from desert sand  from Ouré Cassoni in Chad.

References

Bacteria described in 2013
Actinomycetia